Heritage Hills may refer to the following places:

 Heritage Hills, Colorado in Douglas County, Colorado, United States
 Heritage Hills, New York in Westchester County, New York, United States
 Heritage Hills, Alberta in Strathcona County, Alberta, Canada
 Heritage Hills, Oklahoma City, a neighborhood of Oklahoma City, Oklahoma, United States
 Heritage Hills High School in Lincoln City, Indiana, United States

See also 
Heritage Hill Historic District (disambiguation)